O. robusta  may refer to:
 Obesotoma robusta, a sea snail species
 Opuntia robusta, the wheel cactus or camuesa, a plant species native to Mexico
 Otophryne robusta, the sapito robusto, a frog species found in Guyana, Venezuela and possibly Brazil

See also
 Robusta (disambiguation)